The Evergreen Group is the organizational designation used by a Taiwan-based conglomerate of shipping, transportation, and associated service companies. The Evergreen Group arose in 1975 from the diversification of the original Evergreen Marine Corporation, which was established in 1968 and currently operates as the world's fourth largest containerized-freight shipping company. Today, the Evergreen Group encompasses the Evergreen Marine Corporation, Evergreen International Corporation, EVA Air, Evergreen Aviation Technologies Corporation, Evergreen Air Services Corporation, Evergreen Air Cargo Services Corporation, and Evergreen International Storage and Services Corporation. Additional divisions and subsidiaries exist within several Evergreen Group companies, such as Uniglory Shipping Corporation and Uni Air.

Evergreen Marine Corporation

Evergreen Marine is the fourth-largest containerized shipping company in the world, with a fleet of over 150 ships calling on 240 ports worldwide in about 80 countries. Evergreen Marine Corporation includes subsidiaries/divisions Uniglory Shipping Corporation, Hatsu Marine Ltd., and Italia Marittima S.p.A.

In 2021, the Ever Given was stranded for nearly a week in the Suez Canal and caused a major obstruction that interrupted international maritime trade.

Evergreen International Corporation
Evergreen International Corporation includes Evergreen International Hotels, which operates the chain of Evergreen hotels and resorts worldwide, a Cultural Development Division, and the Evergreen Symphonic Orchestra.

Evergreen International Hotels
The largest division of the Evergreen International Corporation is Evergreen International Hotels, which operate nine hotels in Taiwan, China, Thailand, Malaysia, and France.

EVA Air

EVA Air is the international airline of Evergreen Group, operating regular flights to over 40 destinations worldwide.  EVA Air features full passenger and dedicated cargo operations to North America, Asia, Europe, and Oceania. The parent company of EVA Air, EVA Airways Corporation, has links with the Evergreen Aviation Technologies Corporation, Evergreen Air Services Corporation, and Evergreen Air Cargo Services Corporation.

UNI Air
EVA Air's domestic and regional subsidiary is Uni Air, operating a network of intra-Taiwan routes and flights to several international destinations in the Southeast Asian region.

Evergreen Aviation Technologies Corporation
In 1998, Evergreen Group's EVA Air partnered with General Electric to form the Evergreen Aviation Technologies Corporation (EGAT), a heavy maintenance and aircraft overhaul service. EGAT provides safety, repair, and refit services for EVA Air and other airlines' aircraft. In 2006, Boeing awarded EGAT an exclusive contract to convert four Boeing 747-400 aircraft into ultra-large Boeing 747 Large Cargo Freighter Dreamlifters for the new Boeing 787 Dreamliner program.

In 2020, EGAT announced that they would be segmenting into two distinct units with EGAT MRO to handle EGAT's maintenance, repair and operations business and EGAT FAB to handle EGAT's components fabrication business.

Evergreen Air Services Corporation
Evergreen Air Services Corporation provides logistical and material support in the airline industry.

Evergreen Air Cargo Services Corporation
Evergreen Air Cargo Services Corporation provides logistical and material support in the air cargo industry.

History
Dr. Chang Yung-fa, Chairman of the Evergreen Group, was born in Taiwan in 1927.  After graduating from Taipei Commercial High School at the age of 18, he went to work in the Taipei office of a Japanese shipping line.

After World War II, he joined the seagoing staff of a local shipping company as 3rd officer.  His subsequent career was spent with various local companies and he progressed smoothly through the ranks to 2nd officer, chief officer and eventually to captain.

Foundation of Evergreen Marine Corporation

In 1961, Chang and others established a shipping company; he branched out on his own by establishing Evergreen Marine Corporation on September 1, 1968, with just one secondhand 15,000 dwt vessel, Central Trust.

Over the next four years, Chang built his fleet up to 12 vessels.  Within a year, he had expanded to the Middle East.  Within three, Chang was dispatching Evergreen ships to the Caribbean.

Back in 1975, Chang realized that containerisation was the way forward. He built four advanced S-type container ships and launched his US East Coast service, adding the US West Coast fifteen months later. Europe followed in 1979.

By 1984, he started his most ambitious service yet – two 80-day round-the-world services, one circling the globe in an easterly direction, the other westward.  Departing every 10 days, the 20 G-type container ships he employed had a capacity of 2,728 containers each and could travel at a speed of 20.5 knots.

Expansion and formation of Evergreen Group

The Evergreen Group has expanded beyond the shipping industry to encompass operations in energy development, air transport, hotels and resort services.
    
The province's first private international airline, EVA Airways Corporation, was established on March 8, 1989, and on July 1, 1991, formally inaugurated its first flight and began a new era of national commercial aviation.

In line with the development of its airline industry, Evergreen has become the first Taiwanese enterprise to gain a worldwide foothold in the hotel industry.

In 1998, Evergreen purchased the Italian shipping line Lloyd Triestino renaming as Italia Marittima S.p.A. on 1 March 2006, thus providing it with a firm foothold in the European Union. It consolidated this position in 2002 with the establishment of Hatsu Marine in London, a UK-flag shipping company that today operates some of the largest and most sophisticated vessels in the Evergreen Group fleet.
 
The Evergreen Group, with over 18,000 employees and more than 240 offices/agents worldwide, now comprises over 50 major corporations worldwide, three of which are listed on the Taipei Stock Exchange.

In 2006, the Kuomintang sold its former headquarters to Evergreen Group for $2.3 billion New Taiwan dollars (96 million United States dollars). In 2010, Evergreen Group announced that it would buy 10 ships each from Samsung Heavy Industries and CSBC Corporation as part of an ambitious plan to double its current fleet of 81 ships.

See also
 Maritime industries of Taiwan
 List of largest container shipping companies

References

External links

 
Port operating companies